Egerton Leigh  (7 March 1815 – 1 July 1876) was a British landowner, soldier, Conservative politician and author.

Personal life
Leigh was the only son of Egerton Leigh and Wilhelmina Sarah, daughter of George Stratton, and succeeded his father as head of the ancient Cheshire family of Leigh of West Hall, High Legh; the Leigh Baronets of South Carolina were a cadet branch of this family, while his first name was derived from his descent from John Egerton, 2nd Earl of Bridgewater. An earlier junior branch of the medieval Leigh family became Barons Leigh and Earls of Chichester.

He was lord of the manors of High Legh and Twemlow, patron of the benefice of High Legh and of the 1st mediety of Lymm. He was educated at Eton College.

Leigh married Lydia Rachel, daughter of John Smith Wright, JP in 1842. They had several children, the eldest of whom was Egerton Leigh (who married first Lady Elizabeth Gore White; who died 1880) and great-grandfather of the Conservative politician Sir Edward Leigh, MP for Gainsborough (since 1983). He died on 1 July 1876; his wife survived him by 17 years and died on 3 April 1893.

Military and political career
After leaving Eton, Leigh entered the army as Cornet in the Queen's Bays, and went on to serve as a captain in the 2nd Dragoon Guards and a major and brevet lieutenant-colonel in the Cheshire Militia. He was appointed a Justice of the Peace and Deputy Lieutenant for Cheshire, and served as High Sheriff of the county in 1872. At a by-election in 1873 he was elected to parliament for Mid Cheshire, which seat he represented until his death three years later. He was a staunch Conservative, in favour of the union of Church and State and of economy in public expenditure.

Published works

Leigh, also an author, wrote Ballads & Legends of Cheshire (1867) and A Glossary of Words Used in the Dialect of Cheshire (1877).

See also
 High Legh
 High Sheriff of Cheshire

References

External links 
 

1815 births
1876 deaths
People educated at Eton College
Conservative Party (UK) MPs for English constituencies
UK MPs 1868–1874
UK MPs 1874–1880
High Sheriffs of Cheshire
People from Cheshire